Qeshlaq-e Faraj Hajj Owraj (also Romanized as Qeshlāq-e Faraj Ḩājj Owraj; also known as Faraj Qeshlāq) is a village in Qeshlaq-e Jonubi Rural District, Qeshlaq Dasht District, Bileh Savar County, Ardabil Province, Iran. At the 2006 census, its population was 43, in 10 families.

References 

Tageo

Towns and villages in Bileh Savar County